"Lovin' Only Me" is a song written by Hillary Kanter and Even Stevens, and recorded by American country music artist Ricky Skaggs.  It was released in February 1989 as the first single from the album Kentucky Thunder.  The song was Skaggs' fourteenth and final number one on the country chart.  The single went to number one for one week and spent a total of fifteen weeks on the country chart.

Chart performance

Year-end charts

References

1989 singles
1989 songs
Ricky Skaggs songs
Songs written by Even Stevens (songwriter)
Song recordings produced by Steve Buckingham (record producer)
Song recordings produced by Ricky Skaggs
Epic Records singles